Jaclyn Reding (born March 23 in Ohio, United States) is an American writer of historical romance novels. She has been a Golden Quill Awards winner and the author of an Amazon.com's #1 bestseller. She also is a National Readers' Choice Awards finalist and has received a nomination for the Romance Writers of America RITA Award.

Biography
Reding first started writing in 1989, Her first book was rejected; she sold her second book in 1992, and it was published in 1993. Since her first novel she has since gone on to publish over a dozen award winning novels.

She has been a Golden Quill Awards winner and a National Readers' Choice Awards finalist. She has received a nomination for the RITA Award for her book The Secret Gift. She is also the author of the Amazon.com #1 bestseller, The Pretender, a Georgian-era Scottish historical.

Reding lives in Massachusetts with her husband, Steven Reding, and their son.

Bibliography

Single novels
 Deception's Bride, (1993/Sep)
 The Second Chance, (2006/Feb)
 Spellstruck, (2007/Feb)

Restoration series
 Tempting Fate, (1995/Jan)
 Chasing Dreams, (1995/Oct)
 Stealing Heaven, (1996/Sep)

White Regency series
 White Heather, (1997/Aug)
 White Magic, (1998/Sep)
 White Knight, (1999/Nov)
 White Mist, (2000/Nov)

The Highland Heroes series
 The Pretender, (2002/Mar)
 The Adventurer, (2002/Nov)
 The Secret Gift, (2003/Nov)

Anthologies in collaboration
 "Written in the Stars" in In Praise of Younger Men, (2001/Mar) (with Jo Beverley, Cathy Maxwell and Lauren Royal)

References

External links
 Homepage
 Biography and list of books
 NAL biography
 PRW biography

20th-century American novelists
21st-century American novelists
American romantic fiction writers
American women novelists
Novelists from Ohio
Novelists from Massachusetts
Living people
Year of birth missing (living people)
Women romantic fiction writers
20th-century American women writers
21st-century American women writers